Skule is a given name. Notable people with the name include:

Skule Bårdsson ( 1189–1240), Norwegian nobleman
Skule Storheill (1907–1992), Norwegian naval officer
Skule Waksvik (1927–2018), Norwegian sculptor

Norwegian given names